One Man Army and the Undead Quartet was a Swedish band, that played a fusion of melodic death metal and thrash metal. The band was formed by vocalist Johan Lindstrand after the breakup of The Crown. After two albums on Nuclear Blast Records, they moved to Massacre Records. Their third album, Grim Tales, received lukewarm reviews.

The band officially split-up in 2012.

Members

Final line-up
Johan Lindstrand – vocals (2004-2012)
Robert Axelsson – bass (2005-2012)
Jonas Blom – lead guitar (2009-2012)
Marek Dobrowolski – drums (2005-2012)

Past members
 Mikael Lagerblad – lead guitar (2005-2009)
 Valle Adzic – bass (2005)
Pekka Kiviaho – rhythm guitar (2005-2007)
Mattias Bolander - lead guitar (2008-2011)

Discography

Albums 
21st Century Killing Machine (Album, Nuclear Blast, 2006)
Error in Evolution (Album, Nuclear Blast, 2007)
Grim Tales (Album, Massacre Records, 2008)
The Dark Epic (Album, Massacre Records, 2011)

Singles/EPs 
When Hatred Comes to Life (EP, 2005)
"Christmas for the Lobotomizer" (Single, 2006)

References

External links 

One Man Army And The Undead Quartet
Endlesswar.net
Remember the Gods – Tribute to The Crown
MySpace Page

Musical groups established in 2004
Musical groups disestablished in 2012
Swedish death metal musical groups
Swedish thrash metal musical groups
Musical quintets
Nuclear Blast artists